Tepa is a small town and is the capital of Ahafo Ano North, a district in the Ashanti Region of Ghana. The old town of Tepa is known as Kelebim. Kelebim can be found in Tepa Ward 1 (Banieh Krom). The major occupation of the people there is Farming.

References

External links
Recent weather in Tepa
www.wanzitech.com

 
Populated places in the Ashanti Region